Thomaz Bellucci was the defending champion, however he lost in the final to his compatriot Marcos Daniel in three sets (1–6, 6–3, 3–6).

Seeds

Draw

Finals

Top half

Bottom half

References
 Main Draw
 Qualifying Draw

Copa Petrobras Sao Paulo - Singles
Copa Petrobras São Paulo